The Octalysis Framework is a human-focused gamification design framework that lays out the eight core drives for humans motivation developed by Yu-Kai Chou. The framework is based on the premise that systems are “function-focused”, designed to complete a task as quickly as possible, similar to a factory process assuming workers will complete their tasks in a timely manner because they are required to do so. However, human-focused design acknowledges that people, unlike machines in a system have feelings, insecurities, and reasons why they want or do not want to do certain things, and therefore, optimizes for their feelings, motivations, and engagement.

The framework lays out the structure for analyzing the driving forces behind human motivation. It is the process of applying the core behavior drives that motivate a user to complete a task efficiently through an interactive experience. The Octalysis framework is used in healthcare, fitness, education, training, company, and product design to increase user engagement, ROI and motivation.

Eight Core Drives 
The Octalysis framework suggests that if there are no core drives present, then there is no motivation and no behavior will happen. This is based on the premise that almost all games appeal to certain core drives within us and motivate us towards a variety of decisions and activities. The framework divides these motivations into eight core drives.

Core Drive 1: Epic Meaning and Calling 
This Core Drive is in play when a person believes he or she is doing something greater than oneself or was “chosen” to take action. An example would be Wikipedia volunteers who maintain the page and contribute to the development of its content. Contributors do not receive any extrinsic reward, but they feel that their contribution will help to develop and protect human knowledge. The implementation of this drive can vastly differ, and is not limited to altruistic behavior. Some of the world's worst events and actions have happened with the belief of participating in something greater than oneself.

Core Drive 2: Development and Accomplishment 
This is the Core Drive where people are driven by a sense of growth towards a goal and accomplishing it. Win-State is often a scenario in which user has overcome a challenge. The perception of the challenge is important. For example, a badge or trophy without a challenge is not meaningful for a person. This is the drive that most PBLs: Points, Badges, and Leaderboards focus on.

Core Drive 3: Empowerment of Creativity and Feedback 
This drive is expressed when users are engaged in a creative process where they repeatedly figure new things out and try different combinations. People not only need ways to express their creativity, but also need to see the results of their creativity, receive feedback, and adjust in turn. This is why playing with Legos, playing Minecraft, and making art are intrinsically fun. When properly designed and integrated to empower users to be creative; they often become Evergreen Mechanics: a game designer no longer needs to continuously add content to keep the activity fresh and engaging. The brain simply entertains itself.

Core Drive 4: Ownership and Possession 
This drive refers to users feeling like they own or control something. When a person feels ownership over something, they innately want to increase and improve what they own. For example, the human desire to accumulate wealth and the overvaluing of objects within one's possession are the result of this drive. People might think their house is worth far more than the market is willing to pay for it, not because of any intrinsic property of the house but because they personally own it.

Core Drive 5: Social Influence and Relatedness 
This drive incorporates all the social elements that motivate people, including: mentorship, social acceptance, companionship, and even competition and envy. When you see a friend that is amazing at some skill or owns something extraordinary, you become driven to attain the same. Think about how we naturally draw closer to people, places, or events that we can relate to, turning into a spot premium motivator.

Core Drive 6: Scarcity and Impatience 
Scarcity and impatience is the core drive of wanting something simply because it is extremely rare, exclusive, or immediately unattainable. Many games have Appointment dynamics or torture breaks within them (come back in 2 hours to get your reward). The fact that people can’t get something right now motivates them to return to check the availability of the product.

Core Drive 7: Unpredictability and Curiosity 
Unpredictability is the core drive of constantly being engaged because you don't know what is going to happen next. When something does not fall into your regular pattern recognition cycles, your brain kicks into high gear and pays attention to the unexpected. This is the primary core drive behind gambling addictions, but also present in every sweepstake or lottery program that companies run. Think about the controversial Skinner Box experiments, where an animal presses a lever more frequently when rewards are unpredictable than when rewards occur at fixed times.

Core Drive 8: Loss and Avoidance 
Loss and avoidance is the core drive that motivates us to avoid something negative from happening. On a small scale, it could be to avoid losing previous work or changing one's behavior. On a larger scale, it could be to avoid admitting that everything you did up to this point was useless because you are now quitting. Opportunities that are fading away have a strong utilization of this core drive, because people feel if they didn't act immediately, they would lose the opportunity to act forever. This is commonly known as fear of missing out and can often be seen in marketing promotions with limited time periods, or speculative investments where any delay may lead to missing out on a once-in-a-lifetime opportunity.

Left and Right Brain Core Drives 
Everything we do is based on one or more of the eight core drives. If none of them is present, there is zero motivation and no action takes place. Additionally, each of these drives have different natures within them. Some make the user feel powerful, but do not create urgency. Others core drives create urgency, obsession, and even addiction, but make the user feel bad. Some are more short-term extrinsically focused, while some are more long-term intrinsically focused.

As a result, the 8 core drives are charted on an octagon not simply for aesthetic purposes, but because the placement determines the nature of the motivation.

The left side of the Octalysis chart is commonly associated with logic, analytical thought, and ownership. People are motivated by extrinsic elements such as rewards, money, goals, milestones, points, badges, recognition. However, once people obtain the goal or get used to it, they no longer take the desired behavior.

The right side of the Octalysis chart relies on intrinsic motivation: creativity, self-expression and social dynamics. You don't need a goal or reward to use your creativity, hangout with friends, or to feel the suspense of unpredictability. Balancing extrinsic and intrinsic core drives is an important task; research shows that extrinsic motivation impairs intrinsic motivation. Because once the companies stop offering the extrinsic motivator, user motivation will often plummet to a level much lower than when the extrinsic motivator was first introduced (the Over-justification Effect).

Keep in mind that left brain and right brain references are not literal in terms of actual brain geography, but merely a symbolic differentiation between two distinct functions of the brain.

White Hat and Black Hat Core Drives 

White Hat core drives make us feel powerful, fulfilled, and satisfied. On the Octalysis octagon they are represented on the top. It involves motivations that engage the user on expressing creativity and achievement through mastering of skills, resulting in a higher sense of accomplishments, meaning, and empowerment. While they make us feel powerful, fulfilled and satisfied, they don't attain much urgency ("I am going to save the world, but I need a coffee first”).

Black Hat core drives are located at the bottom of the Octalysis chart. Black Hat core drives make us feel obsessed, anxious and addicted. If you are always doing something because you don't know what will happen next, you are constantly in fear of losing something, or because you're struggling to attain things you can't have, the experience will often leave a bad taste in your mouth  even if you are consistently motivated to take these actions.

The White Hat core drives are represented by the core drives at the top of the Octalysis diagram:
 Core Drive 1: Epic Meaning and Calling
 Core Drive 2: Development and Accomplishment
 Core Drive 3: Empowerment of Creativity and Feedback

The Black Hat core drives are represented by the core drives at the bottom of the Octalysis diagram:
 Core Drive 6: Scarcity and Impatience
 Core Drive 7: Unpredictability and Curiosity
 Core Drive 8: Loss and Avoidance

Game Techniques 

Each Core Drive has many game techniques associated with it. For example, Boosters  or items that empower Desired Actions  are a game technique of Core Drive 3: Empowerment of Creativity and Feedback. These techniques are numbered and can be found in both the book and the blog.

Application 

Using the Octalysis framework, Magnum created a digital online game that resembles the Super Mario game. After playing the game, the player is returned to Magnum’s main site.

mHealth has developed applications based on the Octalysis framework to assist people in self-care management and self-stress management. They are using framework to map how top rated stress management apps address the right brain drives and to provide motivation to increase adherence.

Other global companies that have used or been inspired by the Octalysis Framework include IDEO, Google, LEGO, Volkswagen, and Huawei.

See also 
Gamification
Motivation
Behavioral Economics

References 

Behavioral economics
Gamification